Colleton is a county located in the Lowcountry region of the U.S. state of South Carolina.

Colleton may also refer to:
Colleton, Chulmleigh, England
Colleton baronets
James Colleton (died 1706), governor of the English proprietary Province of Carolina
Sir John Colleton, 1st Baronet (1608–1666), served King Charles I during the English Civil War
Sara Colleton, American television and film producer
USS Colleton (APB-36), a Benewah-class barracks ship

See also